T. K. Velappan Nair (27 September 1929 – 27 February 2005), popularly known as Pukazhenthi, was an Indian music director of Malayalam, Tamil and Telugu films.

Biography
Pukazhenthi was born on 27 September 1929, in Thiruvananthapuram, to Keshapillai and Janaki Amma. He did his schooling at V. M. School, Chala. He adopted the name of the famous Tamil poet Pukazhenthi on starting his career as a music director. He started his career as a music director scoring music for the songs of the Tamil play Thozhan. His guru M. P. Sivam (M. Parameswaran Nair) introduced him to music director K. V. Mahadevan, which was a turning point in his career. Pukezhenthi worked as Mahadevan's associate in 250 films in Tamil, Telugu and Malayalam. After scoring music for a few Tamil films, Pukazhenthi debuted in Malayalam with Muthalali (1965). Within a career spanning more than 15 years, he scored just 12 films in Malayalam, but most of them had several evergreen songs. He also scored a few Tamil and Telugu films, and some devotional songs in all the four South Indian languages. He is known as "Puhalendi" in Telugu film industry.
Mahadevan-Puhalendi as music director duo scored music for N. T. Rama Rao 1993 film Srinatha Kavi Sarvabhowmudu
 His last work came in 1995. He died aged 75 in a hotel room in Thiruvananthapuram on 27 February 2005 after a cardiac arrest.

Filmography
Malayalam
 Muthalali (1965)
 Bhagyamudra (1967)
 Vilakuranja Manushyar (1969)
 Kochaniyathi (1971)
 Moonu Pookkal (1971)
 Vithukal (1971)
 Sneehadeepame Mizhi Thurakku (1972)
 Rakkuyil (1973)
 Kalyana Sougandhikam (1975)
 Agniparvatham (1979)
 Arayannam (1981)
 Hima Nandini (1995)
Tamil
 Selviyin Selvan (1968)
 Gurudakshinai (1969)

References
 
 
 

Tamil film score composers
Indian male composers
Malayalam film score composers
1927 births
2005 deaths
20th-century Indian composers
Musicians from Thiruvananthapuram
Film musicians from Kerala
Male film score composers
20th-century male musicians